Menophra taiwana is a moth of the family Geometridae. It is endemic to Taiwan.

References

Boarmiini
Moths described in 1910
Moths of Taiwan
Endemic fauna of Taiwan